Ousman may refer to:

Larmin Ousman (born 1981), a Liberian footballer (defender)
Ousman Jallow (born 1988), a Gambian footballer
Ousman Jammeh (born 1953), a Gambian politician
Ousman Koli (born 1988), a football defender from Gambia
Ousman Nyan (born 1975), a retired Norwegian footballer
Ousman Rambo Jatta, alias Rambo, is the Councilor of Old Bakau in Gambia
Ousman Sonko (born 1969), a Gambian politician
Pa Ousman Sonko (born 1984), a Gambian football defender